Bettendorf is a city in Scott County, Iowa, United States. It is the 15th largest city of Iowa and the third-largest city in the "Quad Cities". It is part of the Davenport–Moline–Rock Island, IA-IL Metropolitan Statistical Area. The population was 39,102 at the 2020 U.S. Census.

Bettendorf is one of the Quad Cities, along with neighboring Davenport and the Illinois cities of Moline, East Moline and Rock Island. The Quad Cities have a population estimate of 382,630.

History
Bettendorf lies in the original Wisconsin Territory, which the United States bought from the Sac and Fox Indians after defeating them in the Black Hawk War. The territory was ceded in the Black Hawk Purchase of 1832. The first European-American settlers established a village they called Lilienthal, after an early tavern and dance hall. The village of Gilbert developed alongside Lilienthal in 1858, honoring Elias Gilbert, who platted the original site. At that time, the residents were predominantly German immigrants and worked as farmers, skilled laborers, and small business owners. The two villages eventually combined to become the town of Gilbert.

Circa 1900, the town gave William and Joseph Bettendorf  of riverfront land on the condition that they move their iron wagon business from Davenport to Gilbert. In 1903, the town of 440 citizens petitioned for incorporation, requesting to change the town's name in honor of the brothers whose factory was a major economic influence in the early development of the city.

In the late 1940s, Aluminum Company of America (A.L.C.O.A.) chose Riverdale, an enclave of Bettendorf, for construction of the world's largest aluminum mill. The huge mill, and the attendant developments from it, created thousands of jobs and greatly increased growth in Bettendorf's population, which has continued to the present day.

The first modern-day riverboat casinos in the United States were launched in Bettendorf on April 1, 1991 by local businessman Bernard Goldstein. He went on to found the Isle of Capri Casinos. Goldstein and his family members also operate Alter Companies, which is a scrap metal, barge and towboat company operating on the river waterfront. The Quad Cities Waterfront Convention Center opened by the casino and hotel in 2009. It is owned by the city and operated by the Isle of Capri.

The city of Bettendorf is located along the banks of the Mississippi River. Because of this the city of Bettendorf goes through a great deal of flooding and deals annually with Storm Water run off. In 2000, Missman, Stanley & Associates prepared a Comprehensive Storm Water study on all 14 of the city's drainage ways. This study included future Capital Improvement Projects. The City of Bettendorf's Stormwater Section will be the organization to implement this comprehensive plan. There are 169 inlets that have found to be insufficient and not working to proper code for handling rainfall over 1.25 inches and in handling of rainfall into all city creeks. Due to this, several creeks such as Crow Creek, Pigeon Creek, Spencer Creek, and others are continuing to flow and destroy personal property because of not handling the water being put into the creek properly and having the creek banks secured. The City of Bettendorf has been collecting storm water fees on water bills to maintain and resolve these issues.

Efforts are focused on improving surface water quality which will in turn improve the quality of drinking water, increase viability for fish and decrease flooding. The plan includes the repair and cleaning of roadside pipes and ditches, replacing small culverts with larger ones and maintaining the system on a regular basis. Routine inspections are performed during dry weather to detect and address illicit discharges.

Beginning in 2012, a portion of downtown Bettendorf's buildings were torn down to make way for the new I-74 Bridge project and as part of a corresponding downtown Bettendorf redevelopment. The original I-74 twin bridge span was built in 1935 and the second in 1961. The I-74 Bridge project will demolish the original twin spans and construct a new I-74 bridge over the Mississippi River. The 1.2 billion dollar bridge project began construction in July, 2017 and is expected to be completed in 2021. The project converted Grant Street, in the vicinity of I-74, to a two-way street with three lanes in each direction. New commercial and residential construction in downtown Bettendorf has occurred in the redesigned corridor. The I-74 bridge connects Bettendorf and Moline, Illinois.

Geography
Bettendorf is located at  (41.550044, −90.493679).

Climate

Demographics

2020 census
As of the census of 2020, the population was 39,102. The racial makeup of the city was 82.4% White, 6.2% Asian, 3.7% Black or African American, 0.2% Native American, 1.3% from other races, and 6.2% from two or more races. Ethnically, the population was 5.3% Hispanic or Latino of any race.

2010 census
As of the 2010 census there were 33,217 people, 13,681 households, and 9,225 families residing in the city. The racial makeup of the city was 91.9% White, 2.2% African American, 0.2% Native American, 3.1% Asian, 0.1% Pacific Islander, 0.7% from other races, and 1.8% from two or more races. Hispanic or Latino of any race were 3.6% of the population.

There were 13,681 households, of which 33.0% had children under the age of 18 living with them, 55.7% were married couples living together, 8.4% had a female householder with no husband present, 3.3% had a male householder with no wife present, and 32.6% were non-families. 28.2% of all households were made up of individuals, and 11.5% had someone living alone who was 65 years of age or older. The average household size was 2.42 and the average family size was 2.97.

The median age in the city was 40.7 years. 25.5% of residents were under the age of 18; 5.9% were between the ages of 18 and 24; 24.6% were from 25 to 44; 29.2% were from 45 to 64; and 14.8% were 65 years of age or older. The gender makeup of the city was 48.6% male and 51.4% female.

Government

Bettendorf has a mayor and city council form of government with seven city council members. Two council members are elected at-large, while the other five are elected by each of the city's five wards. Bettendorf’s current Mayor is Robert Gallagher. Council members are Frank Baden (at-large), Lisa Brown (at-large), Jerry Sechser (1st ward), Scott Naumann (2nd Ward), William Connors (3rd Ward), Greg Adamson (4th ward), Scott Webster (5th ward).

Education
Bettendorf is home to two school districts. The Bettendorf Community School District and the Pleasant Valley Community School District are both located in Bettendorf.

Bettendorf School District
The Bettendorf Community School District covers most areas of central, northern and western Bettendorf. Elementary students are assigned to one of five elementary schools: named in honor of Neil Armstrong, Herbert Hoover, Paul Norton, Mark Twain and Grant Wood. The district also has a middle and high school. The Neil Armstrong School is the only one in the district to operate on a "balanced calendar" of year-round, full-time use. A seven-member board of education represents district residents.

Pleasant Valley School District

The Pleasant Valley Community School District encompasses areas of eastern Bettendorf, as well as the outlying communities of Pleasant Valley, Riverdale and LeClaire. Located inside the city limits are four of the district's six elementary schools (Pleasant View, Riverdale Heights, Hopewell and Forest Grove), while Pleasant Valley High School and the administrative center are in nearby Riverdale. Junior high students attend Pleasant Valley Junior High School, on the outskirts of LeClaire, while LeClaire elementary students go to either Cody or Bridgeview Elementary Schools. Board members are elected from seven director districts, five within Bettendorf's city limits and two others serving LeClaire-area residents. The high school has 1,232 students, the junior high 501 students, and the four combined elementary schools 1,821 students. The total district has 3,454 students.

Both high schools are part of the Mississippi Athletic Conference for sports.

Private schools
Also located within the city limits are Rivermont Collegiate, a nonsectarian, independent, multicultural, college-preparatory school for preschool through 12th-grade students; Lourdes Catholic School, a Roman Catholic school for preschool through 8th-grade students; and Morning Star Academy, a Christian school for preschool through 12th-grade students. Rivermont Collegiate operates in the former mansion of J.W. Bettendorf, namesake of the city.

Post-secondary education
Scott Community College, part of the Eastern Iowa Community College District, is located in Riverdale, but is commonly referred to as being located in Bettendorf. Two private colleges are also located in Bettendorf: Upper Iowa University a private university based in Fayette, Iowa, operates its Quad Cities Center in Bettendorf near the Davenport border; the Quad Cities Campus of Brown Mackie College, a for-profit college based in Salina, Kansas, is located nearby.

Other
The Bettendorf, Pleasant Valley, and North Scott school districts operate a consortium alternative high school, Edison Academy, in downtown Bettendorf. The Mississippi Bend Area Education Agency, one of nine such agencies in the state of Iowa, operates a Learning Center in the former Bettendorf High School building in central Bettendorf, offering professional development and continuing education services for educators, as well as driver education and home school testing services for students.

Media

Sports

See also
 Mississippi Athletic Conference for high school sports.

Notable people

 Chris Anthony, arena football player
 Pat Angerer, linebacker, drafted in the 2010 NFL Draft by the Indianapolis Colts
 Tavian Banks, (born 1974) NFL player, Big Ten Conference player of the year, first-team All-American
 Scott Beck, filmmaker, writer/producer of A Quiet Place
 Jack Fleck, (1921–2014) golfer who won the 1955 U.S. Open.
 Michael Grumley, (1942–1988) writer 
 Hazel Keener, actress
 Mark Kerr, (born 1968) Mixed Martial Arts (MMA) fighter and subject of the HBO documentary entitled The Smashing Machine,
 Robbie Lawler, (born 1982) former Ultimate Fighting Championship Welterweight champion 
 Rory Markham, mixed martial artist 
 Drew McFedries, mixed martial artist 
 Pat Miletich, mixed martial artist and trainer, first Ultimate Fighting Championship (UFC) Welterweight Champion in 1998 
 Eric Christian Olsen, (born 1977) actor, NCIS: Los Angeles, Dumb and Dumberer 2
 Robert Smallwood, writer
 Tim Sylvia, (born 1976) former Ultimate Fighting Championship Heavyweight champion 
 Bryan Woods, filmmaker, writer/producer of A Quiet Place
Yung Skeeter, American DJ, producer, director, manager, and recording artist

References

External links

 City of Bettendorf, Official Website
 QCTimes – newspaper

 
Bettendorf
Cities in Iowa
Cities in Scott County, Iowa
Cities in the Quad Cities
Iowa populated places on the Mississippi River
1903 establishments in Iowa